Hamilton Records was an American record label started in 1958 as a subsidiary label of Dot Records. Performing artists included the Lennon Sisters.

Its catalog is now owned by Universal Music Group and managed by Geffen Records.

See also
 List of record labels

American record labels
Record labels established in 1958
1958 establishments in the United States